Events from the 1400s in Denmark.

Incumbents 
 Monarch – Eric of Pomerania

Events 
1400
 Jens Due becomes Steward of the Realm.

1403
Præstø is incorporated as a market town.

1409
 7 December  Nysted is incorporated as a market town.

Births

Deaths

See also
 1300s in Denmark

References 

1400s in Denmark